The 2021 Eastbourne International (also known as the Viking International Eastbourne for sponsorship reasons) was a combined men's and women's tennis tournament played on outdoor grass courts. It was the 46th edition of the event for the women and the 10th edition for the men. The tournament was classified as a WTA 500 tournament on the 2021 WTA Tour and as an ATP Tour 250 series on the 2021 ATP Tour. The tournament took place at the Devonshire Park Lawn Tennis Club in Eastbourne, United Kingdom between 21 and 26 June 2021.

Champions

Men's singles

  Alex de Minaur def.  Lorenzo Sonego, 4–6, 6–4, 7–6(7–5)

Women's singles

  Jeļena Ostapenko def.  Anett Kontaveit, 6–3, 6–3

Men's doubles

 Nikola Mektić /  Mate Pavić def.  Rajeev Ram /  Joe Salisbury, 6–4, 6–3

Women's doubles

 Shuko Aoyama /  Ena Shibahara def.  Nicole Melichar /  Demi Schuurs, 6–1, 6–4

Points and prize money

Point distribution

Prize money 

*per team

ATP singles main draw entrants

Seeds

 1 Rankings are as of 14 June 2021.

Other entrants
The following players received wildcards into the main draw:
  Liam Broady
  Jay Clarke
  James Ward

The following players received entry from the qualifying draw:
  James Duckworth
  Ilya Ivashka
  Mikhail Kukushkin
  Mikael Ymer

The following players received entry as lucky losers:
  Norbert Gombos
  Alastair Gray
  Kwon Soon-woo
  Max Purcell
  Andreas Seppi

Withdrawals
  Nikoloz Basilashvili → replaced by  Andreas Seppi
  Marin Čilić → replaced by  Vasek Pospisil
  Laslo Đere → replaced by  Alastair Gray
  Taylor Fritz → replaced by  Yoshihito Nishioka
  Richard Gasquet → replaced by  Max Purcell
  Aslan Karatsev → replaced by  Emil Ruusuvuori
  Filip Krajinović → replaced by  Egor Gerasimov
  Cameron Norrie → replaced by  Norbert Gombos
  Reilly Opelka → replaced by  Kwon Soon-woo
  Benoît Paire → replaced by  Alexei Popyrin
  Stan Wawrinka → replaced by  Aljaž Bedene

Retirements
  Alejandro Davidovich Fokina

ATP doubles main draw entrants

Seeds

1 Rankings are as of 14 June 2021.

Other entrants
The following pairs received wildcards into the doubles main draw:
  Lloyd Glasspool /  Harri Heliövaara
  Alastair Gray /  Luke Johnson

Withdrawals
Before the tournament
  Jamie Murray /  Bruno Soares → replaced by  Luke Bambridge /  Jamie Murray
  Łukasz Kubot /  Marcelo Melo → replaced by  Alexander Bublik /  Nicholas Monroe
  Marin Čilić /  Ivan Dodig → replaced by  Hugo Nys /  Jonny O'Mara
During the tournament
  Luke Bambridge /  Jamie Murray

WTA singles main draw entrants

Seeds

 1 Rankings are as of 14 June 2021.

Other entrants
The following players received wildcards into the main draw:
  Harriet Dart
  Jeļena Ostapenko
  Samantha Stosur
  Heather Watson

The following players received entry from the qualifying draw:
  Camila Giorgi
  Viktorija Golubic
  Marta Kostyuk
  Christina McHale
  Bernarda Pera
  Vera Zvonareva

The following players received entry as lucky losers:
  Shelby Rogers
  Anastasija Sevastova

Withdrawals
Before the tournament
  Sofia Kenin → replaced by  Donna Vekić
  Johanna Konta → replaced by  Daria Kasatkina
  Donna Vekić → replaced by  Shelby Rogers
  Madison Keys → replaced by  Anastasija Sevastova

Retirements
  Camila Giorgi (left thigh injury)
  Vera Zvonareva (left hip injury)

WTA doubles main draw entrants

Seeds

1 Rankings are as of 14 June 2021.

Other entrants
The following pairs received wildcards into the doubles main draw:
  Harriet Dart /  Heather Watson

The following pairs received entry using protected rankings:
  Veronika Kudermetova /  Elena Vesnina
  Bethanie Mattek-Sands /  Sania Mirza
  Samantha Stosur /  CoCo Vandeweghe

Withdrawals
Before the tournament
  Hayley Carter /  Luisa Stefani → replaced by  Hayley Carter /  Nao Hibino
  Gabriela Dabrowski /  Vera Zvonareva → replaced by  Christina McHale /  Sabrina Santamaria

References

External links
 Website

2021 in English tennis
Eastbourne International
2021
June 2021 sports events in the United Kingdom